Clinton Cyrus Thomas (November 25, 1896 – December 2, 1990), nicknamed "Hawk", was a professional baseball player born in Greenup, Kentucky. He was an outfielder and second baseman in the Negro leagues from 1920 to 1938, where he earned the nickname "Hawk" for his sharp-eyed hitting and center field skills.

Career
Thomas played for the Brooklyn Royal Giants, Columbus Buckeyes, Detroit Stars, Hilldale Club, Bacharach Giants, New York Lincoln Giants, New York Harlem Stars, Indianapolis ABCs, New York Black Yankees, Newark Eagles, and Philadelphia Stars.

Thomas was a member of the Philadelphia Hilldale teams that won three consecutive Eastern Colored League championships from 1923 to 1925 and the Negro World Series in 1925. He joined the New York Black Yankees in 1931 and, the following year, "ruined" the opening of Greenlee Field by scoring the only run and making a game-saving catch in the Black Yankees defeat of Satchel Paige's Pittsburgh Crawfords. Nicknamed "The Black DiMaggio", he once hit a home run off Fidel Castro in an exhibition game in Cuba.

After his baseball career ended, Thomas worked as a custodian and staff supervisor for the West Virginia Department of Mines and as a messenger for the State Senate. He died on December 2, 1990, in Charleston, West Virginia.

References

Sources

External links
 and Baseball-Reference Black Baseball stats and Seamheads

1896 births
1990 deaths
Bacharach Giants players
Brooklyn Royal Giants players
Chicago American Giants players
Columbus Buckeyes (Negro leagues) players
Detroit Stars players
Hilldale Club players
Homestead Grays players
Lincoln Giants players
New York Black Yankees players
New York Cubans players
Newark Eagles players
People from Greenup, Kentucky
20th-century African-American sportspeople